William Carey University (also known as Carey, William Carey, or WCU) is a private Christian university in Mississippi, affiliated with the Southern Baptist Convention and the Mississippi Baptist Convention. The main campus is in Hattiesburg, and a second campus is in the Tradition community near Gulfport and Biloxi.

William Carey University was founded by W. I. Thames in 1892 as Pearl River Boarding School in Poplarville, Mississippi. A disastrous fire destroyed the school in 1905, and in 1906, with the backing of a group of New Orleans businessmen, Thames reopened the school in Hattiesburg as South Mississippi College. Another fire destroyed the young institution, forcing it to close. In 1911, W. S. F. Tatum acquired the property and offered it as a gift to the Baptists, and the school reopened as Mississippi Woman's College. In 1953, the Mississippi Baptist Convention voted to make the college coeducational, which necessitated a new name. In 1954, the board of trustees selected the name William Carey College in honor of William Carey, the 18th-century English cordwainer-linguist whose decades of missionary activity in India earned him international recognition as the "Father of Modern Missions." The gained official university status in 2006.

The university offers baccalaureate degrees, Master's degrees, and doctoral degrees. William Carey opened the college of Osteopathic Medicine in 2009 and welcomed its first class of 110 students in 2010. The academic year comprises three trimesters of eleven weeks each. Two summer sessions, a January Term, and a May Term are also offered.

History
The institution that is now William Carey University had its earliest origins in Poplarville, Mississippi, when the noted educator W. I. Thames opened Pearl River Boarding School in 1892. As did many institutions of its day, Pearl River Boarding School offered "elementary, preparatory, and some college work."  A disastrous fire destroyed the school in 1905, and Professor Thames moved to Hattiesburg where, with the backing of a group of New Orleans businessmen, he opened South Mississippi College in 1906. After a fire destroyed this campus, W.S.F. Tatum acquired the property and in 1911, opened the school as Mississippi Woman's College. In 1954, the Board of Trustees, changed its name to William Carey College when the college became coeducational. The school is named for the 18th century English cobbler-linguist whose decades of missionary activity in India earned him international recognition as the "Father of Modern Protestant Missions" William Carey D.D. (1761–1834).

In 1939, the school, which was then called the Mississippi Woman's College, took third place in the William Lowell Putnam Mathematical Competition, and it remains the only women's college to ever place in that competition.

In 1968 William Carey entered a new era when it announced a merger with the Mather School of Nursing in New Orleans.

In 1976, the college purchased the Gulf Coast Military Academy campus in Gulfport.  The beachfront property was devastated by Hurricane Katrina in August 2005, and classes were held in other facilities until the William Carey University-Tradition Campus opened in August 2009.  Located off Highway 67 in Biloxi, it is the center of the 4,800-acre Tradition Planned Community.

On August 14, 2006, William Carey University celebrated its Centennial. This day also marked the transition of William Carey College to William Carey University.

Accreditation

William Carey University is accredited by the Commission on Colleges of the Southern Association of Colleges and Schools to award bachelor's, master's, specialist and doctoral degrees. It is also accredited by the International Assembly for Collegiate Business Education (IACBE) for its business and management programs offered through the School of Business.

The William Carey University College of Osteopathic Medicine is the 29th osteopathic medical school in the United States. Upon the graduation of its inaugural class in 2014, the school was fully accredited by the American Osteopathic Association's Commission on Osteopathic College Accreditation.

William Carey University's School of Business has the following degree programs accredited by the International Assembly for Collegiate Business Education: Master of Business Administration, Bachelor of Science in Business Administration with concentrations in: Accounting, Finance, Computer Information Systems, Management/Marketing, Workforce Training and Management.

Recognition

In the 2017 edition of U.S. News & World Report America's Best Colleges, William Carey University was ranked No. 2 Best Value among regional universities in the South for the second consecutive year. In 2015, William Carey University was ranked No. 1 Best Value among regional universities in the South.

Academics

WCU College of Osteopathic Medicine

On October 23, 2007, the board of trustees at William Carey University (WCU) unanimously voted to authorize Tommy King, president, to employ a dean for the College of Osteopathic Medicine (COM). The rationale was to open the COM to address the severe shortage of physicians in Mississippi and surrounding states and to impact the healthcare of rural Mississippians.

In January 2008, Michael K. Murphy, D.O., was employed to aid in accomplishing this goal. On March 3, 2008, the college was officially established. Press conferences were held in Jackson at the Mississippi Baptist Convention Building and on the Hattiesburg campus of WCU on March 7, 2008. The President announced the establishment of the college and introduced Murphy, the founding dean.  William Carey University College of Osteopathic Medicine was awarded provisional accreditation by the American Osteopathic Association's Commission on Osteopathic College Accreditation at its meeting September 12–13, 2009. On September 13, 2009, William Carey University College of Osteopathic Medicine was awarded provisional accreditation status by the Council on Osteopathic College Accreditation (COCA). In August 2010, the university welcomed its inaugural class of 110 medical students. The World Directory of Medical Schools lists the school as a US medical school along with other accredited US MD and DO programs.

The William Carey University College of Osteopathic Medicine is the state's second medical school and the first in the region to focus on osteopathic medicine and grant the Doctor of Osteopathic Medicine degree. The medical college graduated its first class in 2014.

On January 21, 2017, the William Carey University College of Osteopathic Medicine was severely damaged after being struck by a tornado, as was nearly every building on campus.

School of Music and Ministry Studies
The Winters School of Music is an accredited institutional member of the National Association of Schools of Music. The music therapy program is accredited by the American Music Therapy Association. In February 2018, William Carey University became the first All-Steinway School in the state of Mississippi.

Department of Theatre & Communication and Carey Dinner Theatre
William Carey University's Department of Theatre & Communication began in 1915 by Kate Downs P'Pool, and has garnered a reputation for outstanding work. Since 1994, the department has become actively involved in the Kennedy Center American College Theater Festival. In 2001, William Carey's production of And David Danced was selected for presentation at the National Kennedy Center/American College Theatre Festival in Washington, D.C. In the same year, the department was honored with the Mississippi Governor's Award for Excellence in the Arts.  The department has also twice taken faculty and students to Nairobi, Kenya to produce the musical Smoke on the Mountain. The department produces three productions per year, normally a drama, a children's theatre piece, and a comedy or musical. Their venue is the Joe and Virginia Tatum Theatre.

Carey Dinner Theatre began in 1974 as the "Carey Summer Showcase" under the management of Obra Quave. The longest-running dinner theatre in the state of Mississippi (30+ years), CDT brings professional summer theatre to WCU and the surrounding community. Two CDT alumni (Phillip Fortenberry and Keith Thompson) have gone onto professional Broadway music careers.  CDT produces two shows per summer, normally light-hearted comedies or musicals.

School of Nursing
The Joseph and Nancy Fail School of Nursing is accredited by the Commission on Collegiate Nursing Education, by the board of trustees, Institutions of Higher Learning of the State of Mississippi, and approved in New Orleans by the Louisiana State Board of Nursing.  Best Degree Programs ranked William Carey University's online RN to BSN nursing program as #6 on the list of 30 most affordable programs at private universities.

William Carey University is ranked as having one of the nation's most affordable online nursing programs. Best Degree Programs ranked William Carey University's online RN (Registered nurse) to BSN (Bachelor of Science in Nursing)  nursing program sixth on the list of the 30 most affordable programs at private universities.

School of Pharmacy
The School of Pharmacy anticipates its inaugural class starting in July 2018, pending approval for Precandidate Status from the Accreditation Council for Pharmacy Education.

The inaugural class of 58 students had orientation at the Tradition Campus on July 19-20th of 2018. The three-story, 33,000-square-foot Pharmacy Building has a price tag of $7 million. Carey has an accelerated program that last two years and 10 months. Students will be taking classes year-round in four terms of 10 weeks each. Carey's is one of only 11 accelerated programs in the nation. It is the only such program in Mississippi, Alabama and Louisiana.

Student life
The Student Government Association, SGA, is the head of all campus organizations. The SGA hosts Welcome Week, Homecoming Week (along with the Alumni office), and various activities throughout the year. In addition to activities, the SGA works as a liaison between the students and administration.

William Carey University operates in accordance with its Baptist affiliation and has many programs for its 4000 students. CareyBSU offers Bible studies, ministry to the surrounding area and apartments, mission opportunities, and "Priority Lunch."  It also offers CampusLink which is a worship service time.

The university is served by a newspaper, The Cobbler, which publishes once a month and alternates between a print and online edition. The Cobbler has been in existence since the 1950s; prior to the name change to WCU, it was known as The Scissors and operated from the 1920s until the 1950s.

The name of the yearbook is The Crusader (it was known as The Pine Burr in the MWC days). There is also a literary magazine, The Indigo and an alumni magazine, Carey.

Greek life
Three Christian-oriented organizations exist on campus. Gamma Chi is one sorority focused on sisterhood and service. Gamma Chi's colors are red, black, and white and the mascot is a panda.  Pi Omega is a social and service sorority. Kappa Tau Xi is a social and service fraternity.

Athletics

The William Carey athletic teams are called the Crusaders. The university is a member of the National Association of Intercollegiate Athletics (NAIA), primarily competing in the Southern States Athletic Conference (SSAC; formerly known as Georgia–Alabama–Carolina Conference (GACC) until after the 2003–04 school year) since the 2010–11 academic year. The Crusaders previously competed in the Gulf Coast Athletic Conference (GCAC) from 1981–82 to 2009–10.

William Carey competes in 18 intercollegiate varsity sports: Men's sports include baseball, basketball, cross country, golf, soccer, tennis and track & field; while women's sports include basketball, beach volleyball, cross country, golf, soccer, softball, tennis, track & field and volleyball; and co-ed sports include archery and cheerleading.

Overview
Most of the teams are nationally ranked within the NAIA structure and typically move on to the conference play-offs and the national championship rounds. The athletic department maintains its own website separate from the main university site. The Student Services administration also organizes various indoor and outdoor sports and games through its intramural program.

National championships

Notable alumni

Dan Jennings (Class of 1984), former manager of the Miami Marlins of Major League Baseball.
Ezell Lee politician in the Mississippi House of Representatives and Mississippi Senate.
Chris McDaniel (Class of 1994), attorney and Republican politician in the Mississippi Senate since 2008.
Michael Parker (Class of 1978) politician in the U.S. House of Representatives and former Assistant Secretary of the Army for Civil Works under President George W. Bush.
Larkin I. Smith former police chief, county sheriff, and Republican politician in the U.S. House of Representatives from January 1989 until his death
John Stephenson retired Major League Baseball player who was a catcher from 1964 to 1973.
Richard C. Vinci, retired United States Navy admiral and former commander of the United States Navy Dental Corps

References

External links

 Official website
 Official athletics website

 
1906 establishments in Mississippi
Buildings and structures in Hattiesburg, Mississippi
Education in Forrest County, Mississippi
Educational institutions established in 1906
Hattiesburg metropolitan area
Southern States Athletic Conference
Universities and colleges accredited by the Southern Association of Colleges and Schools
Universities and colleges affiliated with the Southern Baptist Convention
Osteopathic medical schools in the United States
Medical schools in Mississippi
Private universities and colleges in Mississippi